The Sahara Conference of the 2023 BAL season is played from 11 March to 21 March 2023 and will be played in the Dakar Arena in Dakar, Senegal for a second straight season in a row. In a group of six teams, all team played each other one time. The top four teams in the standings advance to the 2023 BAL Playoffs.

REG were the defending Sahara Conference champions, having won the 2022 Conference.

Standings

Games

11 March 
ABC Fighters won the opening day match-up with hosts AS Douanes, behind Abdoulaye Harouna who made his team debut with 25 points. It was the second consecutive year that a Senegalese club lost the home opener in Dakar, after DUC lost in the 2022 season opener.

12 March 
US Monastir opened their 2023 season with a win, while they gave up 21 turnovers against Stade Malien. Souleymane Berthe, the 22-year old starting forward of Stade Malien, scored 34 points in his BAL debut.

14 March 
Stade Malien won their first-ever BAL game behind Aliou Diarra, who had 23 points, 14 rebounds and 5 blocks against the Falcons. Kwara Falcons' 17-year old Modou Fall Thiam impressed by scoring 11 points off the bench.
The Rwandan champions REG had no trouble with AS Douanes and became the first team to clinch their spot in the 2023 BAL Playoffs.

15 March

17 March 
ABC Fighters stunned the favoured defending champions Monastir, behind a game-high 33 points from Abdoulaye Harouna. They ended Monastir's 5-game winning streak lasting from March 2022.

After Stade Malien led 17–16 in the first quarter, AS Douanes never trailed and led by as many as 20 points (66–46) in the fourth quarter. Chris Crawford led Douanes with a game-high 21 points. The league's all-time leading scorer, Terrell Stoglin, did not play.

18 March

20 March

21 March

Game MVPs

References 

Sahara Conference